The Arctic five are the five littoral states bordering the Arctic Ocean: Canada,  Denmark, Norway, Russia and the United States.

Competing narratives exist regarding international governance of the Arctic. There is debate over whether the principal actors should be the Arctic five, the Arctic Council (the Arctic five plus Finland, Iceland and Sweden) or a larger group of states. In 2008, the Arctic five concluded the Ilulissat Declaration causing concern among those not invited. The Arctic Council is perhaps the most important of the bodies involved in Arctic governance. In a briefing note prepared for the 2016 Arctic yearbook, Andreas Kursten acknowledges a widespread view that the five are usurping the Arctic Council's central position but concludes that the two groups are able to complement each other in a positive way.

Meetings of the five
May 27 – 29, 2008 in Greenland: Ilulissat Declaration. This meeting is known as the Arctic Ocean Conference.
March 29, 2010 in Quebec: Chair Summary
July 16, 2015 in Oslo, the Arctic Five adopted the nonbinding Declaration Concerning the Prevention of Unregulated High Sea Fishing in the Central Arctic Ocean, commonly known as the Oslo Declaration. Subsequently, in the "Five-plus-Five process", the five plus China, the European Union (EU), Iceland, Japan and Republic of Korea signed the legally binding Agreement to Prevent Unregulated High Seas Fisheries in the Central Arctic Ocean November 2017 in Washington. The agreement came into force following ratification in June of 2021.

References

Bibliography

Government of the Arctic
Arctic